This is a list of the Nations Cup standings in FIS Alpine Ski World Cup from 1967 to present.

Standings
The Nations Cup standings are calculated by adding up all points each season for all racers from a given nation.

The early years of the World Cup, ‘67 through ‘72, were dominated by the French, as reflected in their Nations Cup wins in 5 of the first 6 years.  The Austrian team then took over throughout the rest of the 1970s, followed by Swiss superiority during most of the 1980s.  A resurgent Austrian team charged back to the top in 1988, beginning a long streak of consecutive Nations Cup triumphs.  Austrian dominance reached its zenith in the late 1990s and 2000s (decade), when their points total regularly doubled that of the second-place finisher, and was capped in the 1999–2000 and 2003–4 seasons with totals that tripled those of runner-up Italy.  Their 17927-point total in 1999–2000 is a Nations Cup record, as is their 12066-point margin of victory in 2003–4.

As of the end of the 2016–17 season, the Austrian team has won 30 consecutive Nations Cups, while topping the men's standings for 25 straight years. Austria is the only nation to have finished in the top 3 of the Nations Cup standings in all 50 years in which World Cup competition has been held, winning in 38 of those years, runner-up in 11 years, and third place in a single year.  Austrian men have failed to make the podium in only one season: 1972.  Austrian women have failed to make the podium in only 2 seasons: 1981 and 1982. Switzerland with 7 wins and France with 5 wins are the only other nations to have won the nations cup. In the midst of the ongoing Austrian juggernaut, the Swiss or Italian teams have usually held second place.  The German team reached the runner-up spot for the first time in 1997–8, as did the Norwegians the next season.  The US enjoyed its best placings ever starting in 2004–5, grabbing second in the Nations Cup for two straight years.

Under the current scoring system (since 1992), the winning nation (Austria every year) has averaged over 13000 points, with an average of over 6400 for the runner-up, 5400 for third place, 4200 for fifth, and 1300 for tenth.  The all-inclusive scoring system (simply adding together all World Cup points earned) favors national teams with great depth and many racers scoring World Cup points, and even teams with several top racers have no realistic chance of breaking the Austrian grip on the top spot, while a team with only one or two top-ranked racers will struggle to ever break the top five in the standings.  There have been numerous calls for a revamped scoring system which would allow other nations to compete more readily for top spots in the Nations Cup, but no changes are likely to be made.  In 2016, however, the Austrian men's team narrowly beat France by just 201 points.

The total number of top-three placings for each nation in the Nations Cup (through the 2021–22 season) are summarized below:

Note: Results for West Germany and Germany are counted together in this table.

References

External links

Nations Cup standings